Faye Nicole Winter (born 21 June 1995) is an English television personality. In 2021, she was a finalist on the seventh series of Love Island and in 2022, she appeared as a contestant on Celebrity MasterChef.

Life and career
Winter was born on 21 June 1995 in Exeter, Devon. Prior to fame, she worked as a estate agent and lettings manager for the three-branch agency East of Exe. In June 2021, she became a contestant on the seventh series of Love Island. Earlier in the series, she was paired with Brad McClelland and Liam Reardon before coupling up with Teddy Soares on Day 14, whom she remained with until the Casa Amor episode when she briefly coupled up with Sam Jackson, before returning to Soares and ultimately finishing in third place with him. Winter's behaviour during the series sparked numerous complaints to Ofcom, with one argument between her and Soares culminating 25,000 complaints. After leaving the series, Winter and Soares appeared on Love Island: Aftersun and Lorraine to discuss their experience, with Winter apologising for her behaviour. Winter later revealed she had been attending therapy due to the comments viewers had made about her following the show. In August 2022, Winter began appearing as a contestant on Celebrity MasterChef. Following two successful rounds, she made it through to the semi-finals.

Filmography

References

External links
 

1995 births
Living people
Love Island (2015 TV series) contestants
Participants in British reality television series
Mass media people from Exeter